Attahiru Muhammadu Jega  (born 11 January 1957) is a Nigerian academic and former Vice-Chancellor of Bayero University, Kano. On 8 June 2010, he was nominated by then President Goodluck Jonathan as the new Chairman of the Independent National Electoral Commission (INEC), subject to Senate confirmation, as a replacement for Professor Maurice Iwu, who vacated the post on 28 April 2010.
Jega was the only INEC chairman to oversee two Nigerian General Elections (2011 and 2015). Jega retired on 30 June 2015, handing over his position to Amina Zakari according to a directive by President Muhammadu Buhari.

Early life and academic career

Jega was born on 11 January 1957 in Jega, Kebbi State.
He attended Sabon Gari Town Primary School, Jega between 1963 and 1969, and proceeded to Government Secondary School, Birnin Kebbi and then was admitted into The Ahmadu Bello University Zaria's Bayero University College, Kano in 1974, graduating in 1979 with a Second Class Upper Division BSc degree in Political Science.
He worked as a teaching assistant at Bayero University, then won a fellowship at Northwestern University, Evanston, Illinois in the United States (1981–1984) where he earned a PhD in Political Sciences.
He returned to the Political Science Department in Bayero University in 1984 as a lecturer.

Other appointments included visiting Senior Research Fellow at the Nigerian Institute of International Affairs, Lagos (March 1992 –  March 1993), visiting Research Fellow, Department of Political Science, University of Stockholm, Sweden (1994), Deputy Vice-chancellor (Academic), Bayero University (1995–1996) and director, Centre for Democratic Research and Training, Bayero University (2000–2004).
Jega was appointed Vice-Chancellor of Bayero University in 2005. He is currently a member of the International Elections Advisory Council.

Political activity

Jega is a former president of the Academic Staff Union of Universities (ASUU), and was an opponent of the Babangida military government in the early 1990s.
Politically leaning towards the left, as ASUU President he was closely associated with the Nigeria Labour Congress (NLC), and continued that connection throughout his career. On 29 April 2010, he was invited as a guest lecturer for the NLC May Day celebration where he presented a paper on 50 Years of Nationhood: Challenges of Good Democratic Governance, Credible Election and the Working Class.
He is widely seen as an astute intellectual with a strong sense of ethics and morality.

Jega was appointed a member of the Justice Mohammed Uwais Electoral Reform Committee, which submitted a report on 11th of December 2008 with recommendations that included establishing commissions to deal with Electoral Offences, Constituency Delimitation and Political Parties Registration and Regulation.
The committee also recommended proportional representation and that the INEC head should be appointed by the judiciary rather than the President.

On the 28 of March 2015, under his leadership, elections were conducted in what Nigerians and the World see as free, fair and credible which declared the APC Presidential candidate General Muhammadu Buhari as winner defeating the Incumbent President Goodluck Jonathan. Jega, ahead of the 2023 Nigerian general elections formed a political opposition named Rescue Nigeria Project (RNP) alongside other past and present political stakeholders.

INEC nomination

Jega's nomination as INEC chairman was approved at a meeting of the National Council of State called by President Jonathan and attended by former heads of state Yakubu Gowon, Muhammadu Buhari, Ibrahim Babangida, Abdulsalami Abubakar, Ernest Shonekan, Olusegun Obasanjo and Shehu Shagari.
The Senate President David Mark, Speaker of the House of Representatives Oladimeji Bankole, and most of the state Governors were also in attendance.
Unanimous approval by the council of the nominee for this critical appointment avoided controversy about whether or not the President should appoint the chairman of the INEC.
Reactions to the announcement from a broad spectrum of political leaders and organisations were positive, although some voiced concern that it could be too late to implement real reforms before the 2011 elections.

During the campaigning for the 2015 Nigerian general election, Attahiru Jega "faced fierce criticism from both the opposition and the ruling party."  Nonetheless, a 23 March 2015 article in Vanguard asserted that "most experts believe Jega will seek to declare an accurate result as quickly as possible, regardless of any political interference he may face."

References

Bibliography
 
 
 
 

Living people
1957 births
Nigerian Muslims
Members of the Independent National Electoral Commission
Bayero University Kano alumni
People from Kebbi State
Northwestern University fellows
Academic staff of Bayero University Kano
Vice-Chancellors of Nigerian universities
21st-century Nigerian politicians